Pantnagar railway station is a small railway station in Udham Singh Nagar district, Uttarakhand. Its code is PBW. It serves Pantnagar city. The station consists of a single platform. The platform is not well sheltered. It lacks many facilities including water and sanitation.

Major trains

The following trains run from Pantnagar railway station :

 Lal Kuan–Bareilly City Passenger (unreserved)
 Agra Fort–Ramnagar Weekly Express
 Bareilly City–Lalkuan Passenger (unreserved)
 Kathgodam–Lucknow Jn. InterCity Express

References

Railway stations in Udham Singh Nagar district
Izzatnagar railway division
Pantnagar